Julie Murray is an Irish-born artist and filmmaker.

Background 
Murray received a bachelor's degree in Fine Art from the National College of Art and Design in Dublin. She then moved to the United States in 1985.

Career 
Her films have been included in The Times London Film Festival, the New York Film Festival, Images Festival, Hong Kong International Film Festival, the Dublin Film Festival and others.

Her art was exhibited in the Whitney Biennial in 2004.  Her piece entitled "America is Hard to See" was also on display at the Whitney in 2015. She was one of three artists to create an embroidery design for Birdies shoes in 2020.

Filmography 
Elements (2008)

Detroit Park (2006)

Orchard (2004)

Deliqium (2003)

I Began to Wish (2003)

Micromoth (2000)

If You Stand With Your Back to the Slowing of the Speed of Light in Water (1999)

Anathema (1995)

A Legend of Parts (1990)

Tr’Cheot’My P’y (1988)

FF (1986)

Recognition 
Her film Element won Best Cinematography award at the 2008 Ann Arbor Film Festival. Her early super-8 films were given a National Film Preservation Foundation Award in 2014. Her films are in the permanent collections of the Museum of Modern Art and the Whitney Museum of American Art.

References 

Year of birth missing (living people)
Living people
Embroidery designers
Irish emigrants to the United States
21st-century Irish women artists
21st-century American women artists